NKN may refer to:

 National Knowledge Network
 North Korean Navy
 Philanthropedia, formerly known as the Nonprofit Knowledge Network
 Supreme National Committee (Polish, Naczelny Komitet Narodowy)